Paul Weiss may refer to:

Paul Weiss (mathematician) (1911–1991), German and British mathematician and theoretical physicist
Paul Weiss (nanoscientist) (born 1959), American nanoscientist
Paul Weiss (philosopher) (1901–2002), American philosopher
Paul Alfred Weiss (1898–1989), Austrian biologist

See also
Paul Weis (1907–1991), Austrian lawyer and survivor of Nazi persecution
Paul, Weiss, Rifkind, Wharton & Garrison, U.S. law firm

Weiss, Paul